NGC 105 is a spiral galaxy estimated to be about 240 million light-years away in the constellation of Pisces. It was discovered by Édouard Stephan in 1884 and its apparent magnitude is 14.1.

Notes

References

External links
 

0105
00241
+02-02-008
01583
Pisces (constellation)
Astronomical objects discovered in 1884
Discoveries by Édouard Stephan
Spiral galaxies